The Kura barbel or lizard barbel (Barbus lacerta) or  is a species of freshwater cyprinid fish from the Near East region.

Footnotes 

 

lacerta
Cyprinid fish of Asia
Freshwater fish of Europe
Fish described in 1843